Bogdan Vodă (until 1968 Cuhea;  (until 1901) or Izakonyha (after 1901),  or Kechnie) is a commune in Maramureș County, Maramureș, Romania. The commune was named after its significant native, Bogdan I, the second founder of Moldavia.

It is composed of two villages: Bocicoel and Bogdan Vodă.

References

Communes in Maramureș County
Localities in Romanian Maramureș